World ParaVolley, formerly the World Organization Volleyball for Disabled (WOVD), is an international organization that is for people with physical disabilities. It is affiliated with the International Paralympic Committee(IPC). The World Organization Volleyball for Disabled was established in 1981 and was part of the International Sports Organization for Disabled (ISOD). In 1992 the WOVD became its own separate Organization in Barcelona, Spain. The WOVD Headquarters were also established in the Netherlands.
The WOVD is responsible for managing and controlling the conduct of international volleyball competitions for men, women and youth. The WOVD also liaises with IPC (as an independent organisation) and with other organizations for people with or without disabilities. The organization adopted its present name World ParaVolley at its 2014 general assembly.

History
As volleyball caught on and became a popular sport and the Olympics became increasingly popular, the paralympic games started coming into play. The first paralympic games were played in 1960 in Rome immediately after the Olympic Games. By 1976, amputees started participating in the paralympics. In 1967 the Dutch introduced a new game called sitting volleyball, which is a combination of sitzball and volleyball. Then in 1978 the ISOD accepted sitting volleyball in its programs. The first official tournament took place in 1979 in Haarlem, Netherlands, and then in 1980 sitting volleyball was accepted as a Paralympic sport with seven players. 
Since 1993, Sitting Volleyball championships have been organized for men and women. It has become one of the main team-sports in the Paralympic Programme. It is a fast, exciting and crowd pleasing sport, which can show the athletic skills of disabled sportsmen/women.

Standing Volleyball for the Disabled, was played by athletes with disabilities long before the international federation was founded. It has its roots in Great Britain and was originally played only by amputee players. To encourage the participation on those ones with a more severe amputation, a classification system has been set up and players on court must follow certain rules. Teams must respect these classification rules to ensure an equitable team composition. International competitions have taken place since the 1960s, although it was not until 1976 that volleyball was accepted into the Paralympic Games Programme, in Toronto, Ontario, Canada. Since 1980 volleyball has had a regular international calendar.

Barry Couzner (OAM) of Australia is the current president.

Origin
The game of Volleyball was created by William G. Morgan,a YMCA physical education director, on February 9, 1895, in Holyoke, Massachusetts (USA). When Morgan first created the game of volleyball it was called Minonette. The first rules,  were written down by Morgan. The game of volleyball was not officially called volleyball until 1896 and was two separate words. As the years went on it later became one word, then a special ball was designed for volleyball in 1900. 64 years later in 1964 Men's and Women's volleyball were introduced as an Olympic sport. Later in 1884 the Men's team won its first Olympic medal and later men's beach volleyball was added as an Olympic sport in 1996.

Kinds of volleyball

Sitting volleyball

Athletics and Sitzball - originating from Germany - were the main sports. Soon it was found that Sitzball, which is played sitting down on the floor, was too passive; more mobile forms of sports were looked for. 
With Sitting Volleyball, the disability of a player is no longer a handicap. Since
players must be sitting on the floor when hitting the ball, only the skill is important, 
not the disability. This produces a very competitive sport.

In 1956, the Dutch Sports Committee introduced a new game called Sitting Volleyball, a combination of sitzball and volleyball. Since then Sitting Volleyball has grown into one of the biggest sports practised in competition not only by the disabled in the Netherlands, but also by interested "able-bodied" volleyball players with an injury of the ankle or  knee.

Sitting Volleyball has the radiation to grow into a sport in which the disabled and non-disabled persons can play on a high technical level.
Sitting Volleyball is played with six players per team on a smaller volleyball court with lowered nets. This version enables double leg amputees and individuals with spinal injuries and various other disabilities to play volleyball. Besides a few rules regarding physical advantages, all nondisabled rules apply.

Standing volleyball
Standing Volleyball which is the only team sport that can be played "standing" by people with physical disabilities. The Amputee athletes have a choice to play with or without prostheses. Depending on the sense of balance, some above the knee amputees will choose to play without a prosthesis hopping on a single leg. Standing volleyball is played on an integrated FIVB rules. 
The game of Standing Volleyball decided to allow other disability groups to take part, therefore encouraging more nations to participate. Although this initially created more classification problems, the WOVD finally, after four years, established criteria for classification, which includes those players with various arm or leg disabilities.

Beach Volleyball
Beach ParaVolley is a version of standing volleyball that is played on beach courts rather than indoor courts. It is played with three-member teams and works within the Paralympic classification system. Standard FIVB Beach Volleyball rules are followed. The sport is growing, with teams regularly competing in Asia and Oceania since 2007. As of 2018, World ParaVolley is working towards inclusion of Paralympic Beach Volleyball as a medal sport in the Los Angeles games in 2028.

References

Volleyball organizations
Sitting volleyball